Assistant commissioner is a rank used in revenue administrations, including those of Bangladesh, India, and Pakistan.

Description
Assistant commissioner is a rank used in revenue administrations (land, income tax, customs, inland, etc.) in various countries.

Use in countries

Bangladesh

In Bangladesh, Assistant Commissioner is the entry level post for some of the cadre services. It is a Grade-9 post. This rank is used in services like Administration, Taxation, Customs and Police. Assistant Commissioner is the entry level rank for the officers of Administration cadre. They play vital role in field administration. At first, they are posted at office of the Deputy Commissioner in Districts. As Executive Magistrates, they conduct mobile courts under the Mobile Court Act, 2009. The officers recruited in Taxation service through BCS exams start their career as Assistant Commissioner of Taxes (ACT).

India

In India, the rank of Assistant Commissioner is used in Indian Income Tax, Customs, Central Excise and Service Tax Administration, as an officer of Indian Revenue.

References

Civil service ranks in Bangladesh
Civil service ranks in India
Civil service ranks in Pakistan